Tetraselmis suecica is a marine green alga. It grows as single, motile cells visible under light microscope up to concentrations over one million cells per milliliter. It can be grown as a foodstock in aquaculture, being amenable to species such as rotifers of the genus Brachionus. It is a motile chlorophyte and contains a high lipid content.
T. suecica proved to have cytotoxic effects on HL-60, MCF-7 and NCI-H460 tumor cells and antioxidant activity. Therefore, they could offer greater benefits as possible natural nutraceuticals for the pharmaceutical industry. More studies are necessary to identify the specific bioactive fractions of each EPS

Adarme-Vegas et al. (2014) state that a reduction in biomass of Tetraselmis spp. was observed in high salinity cultures (50 ppt) as well as in near-freshwater salinity cultures (5 and 10 ppt). Changes in salinity primarily altered biomass productivity with cultures in 30 and 40 ppt having the highest growth rate and final productivity. Salinity had no effect on the percentage of EPA or total Fatty Acid production.

See also
Algaculture

References

High lipid content microalgae
Chlorodendrophyceae